Gregor Ramsay (born 30 June 1996) is a British racing driver, born in Glasgow. In 2014 he competed in Eurocup Formula Renault 2.0 with the Lotus F1 Junior Team.

Career

Karting
Ramsay started karting in the Cadet class at the relatively late age of 10 during the 2007 season at Larkhall, his local track. He then moved into national competition, joining the ZIP Young Guns team of karting legend Martin Hines and being coached by Terry Fullerton.

He then moved onto the international karting scene with the official Tony Kart Junior Team based out of Italy and competing in the WSK (World Series Karting) events throughout Europe. While competing in Italy he started working with the Ferrari Driver Academy. The FDA was instrumental in his acquiring an International race licence, at the age of just 15.

After two race weekends in Formula Abarth at the end of 2011, Ramsay contested the full Formula Abarth European Series in 2012. He won one race at Vallelunga, took another podium at Imola and finished eighth in the championship with Swiss team Jenzer Motorsport.

Formula Renault
For 2013 he switched to Formula Renault with the Euronova team of Vincenzo Sospiri, who is a former star of international motor racing.

World Series by Renault granted Ramsay two wildcard entries for the Renault 2.0 Eurocup, with MP Manor Motorsport running alongside championship leader and fellow Brit, Oliver Rowland. The first being on 15/16 September 2013 at the Hungarian F1 circuit, and on the 29/30 September 2013 at Paul Ricard, France.

2013 was a learning curve year for Gregor in Renault 2.0 and some performances lead to an official top F1 Team junior programme drive in 2014.

Lotus F1 Junior Team
In 2014, Ramsay was signed to the Lotus F1 Junior Team

References

External links
 
 
 

1996 births
Living people
Sportspeople from Glasgow
Scottish racing drivers
Karting World Championship drivers
Formula Renault Eurocup drivers
Formula Renault 2.0 Alps drivers
Formula Renault 2.0 NEC drivers
Manor Motorsport drivers
MP Motorsport drivers
KTR drivers
Euronova Racing drivers
BVM Racing drivers
Jenzer Motorsport drivers
Formula Abarth drivers